Gaetano Cara (1803 – 1877) was an Italian archaeologist and naturalist primarily interested in ornithology.  He practiced forgery and selling forged idols to many European museums.

Gaetano Cara was Director of the natural history museum Regio Museo di Storia Naturale di Cagliari from 1840 to 1858 and then of Museo Archeologico di Cagliari from 1862. In 1842 he provided an avifauna of Sardinia. This was much criticised  by Giuseppe Géné and an amended list was provided by Tommaso Salvadori who made field observations in Sardinia in 1863 as well as consulting the collection of birds of the Natural History Museum of Cagliari. He reported the results in Salvadori, 1864, Catalogo degli Uccelli di Sardegna, con note e osservazioni. Cara responded in 1866 to defend his own studies.

Works
Cara G. 1863 Monumenti d'Antichita di recente trovati in Tharros e Cornus, esistenti nel K. Museo Archeologico. Cagliari.
Cara, G. 1842. Elenco degli uccelli che trovansi nell'isola di Sardegna, od ornitologia sarda.Torino. (Reycend).Digitised
Cara, G. 1866. Osservazioni di Gaetano Cara al catalogo degli uccelli di Sardegna pubblicato dal dott.re Tommaso Salvadori. Cagliari. Timon.

Reprints
Cara, G. 1975. Elenco degli uccelli che trovansi nell'isola di Sardegna, od Ornitologia sarda. Sala Bolognese. Forni. Altra ed.: 1983 ; Ripr. facs. dell'ed. 1842
Cara, G. 1994. Elenco degli uccelli che trovansi nell'isola di Sardegna, od Ornitologia sarda. Cagliari. GIA. Ripr. facs. dell'ed. 1842

References

Cara, G. 1994. Elenco degli uccelli che trovansi nell'isola di Sardegna, od Ornitologia sarda. Cagliari. GIA. Ripr. facs. dell'ed. Introduction

External links
BHL Digitised  Elenco degli uccelli che trovansi nell'isola di Sardegna, od ornitologia sarda

Italian naturalists
Italian ornithologists
1877 deaths
1803 births